 
The Peiwen Yunfu is a 1711 Chinese rime dictionary of literary allusions and poetic dictions. Collated by tone and rime, the dictionary serves the composition of poetry.

Like the Kangxi dictionary, the Peiwen Yunfu was compiled under the patronage of the Kangxi Emperor, whose imperial library was named Peiwen ("esteem/admire writing/phrases/literature"). He believed that previous Chinese dictionaries of multiple-character phrases, including the Yuan Dynasty Yunfu qunyu and the Ming Dynasty  Wuche yunrui, were incomplete and sometimes erroneous. Over twenty editors, including Zhang Yushu (1642–1711) and Chen Tingjing (1638–1712), began the compilation in 1704 and finished in 1711. In 1716, the emperor ordered the creation of a supplement, the Yunfu shiyi, which was completed in 1720.

The Peiwen yunfu is a large dictionary (212  "volumes; fascicles") of two-, three-, and four-character idioms. It contains roughly 560,000 items under 10,257 entries arranged by 106 rhymes. Classical allusions and phrases are classified under the rhyme of their last character, with numerous quotations given to illustrate usage.

Although the Peiwen yunfu, which James Legge calls the "Kangxi Thesaurus", is less famous than the Kangxi dictionary, it can be helpful in tracing literary usages. "Whenever names or phrases are met with which are not understood," say Teng and Biggerstaff, "this is the first work which should be consulted."

See also
Chinese dictionary 
Qieyun 
Guangyun 
Jiyun

References

Further reading
 Parker, E.H. (1885). "Contributions Towards the Topography and Ethnology of Central Asia: 1. Extracts from the P'êi-wên Yün-fu." China Review (1885), Vol. 13, No. 5, pp. 337–386; Vol. 13, No 6, pp. 375–386; Vol. 14, No. 1, pp. 39–49. All these works may be downloaded from:  (accessed 27 Feb. 2011).
 Martin Gimm (1983), "Zur Entstehungsgeschichte der chinesischen Literaturkonkordanz P'eiwen yün-fu." In: T'oung Pao, 69 (1983), p. 159-174; Addenda 70 (1984), p. 279-286.

External links
Peiwen yunfu 佩文韻府, Ulrich Theobald

Chinese classic texts
Chinese dictionaries
Qing dynasty literature